The 1964 Tipperary Senior Hurling Championship was the 74th staging of the Tipperary Senior Hurling Championship since its establishment by the Tipperary County Board in 1887.

Thurles Sarsfields were the defending champions.

On 15 November 1964, Thurles Sarsfields won the championship after a 5-14 to 1-04 defeat of Holycross-Ballycahill in the final at Thurles Sportsfield. It was their 26th championship title overall and their fourth title in succession.

Results

Final

References

Tipperary
Tipperary Senior Hurling Championship